Finanziaria d'investimento Fininvest S.p.A., also known as Fininvest, is an Italian holding company controlled by the Berlusconi family and managed by Silvio Berlusconi's eldest daughter Marina Berlusconi.

Structure
The Fininvest group is composed of a number of companies, such as Arnoldo Mondadori Editore (one of Italy's leading publishing companies), Teatro Manzoni (a theatre in Milan), Alba Servizi Aerotrasporti (a private jet company) and Fininvest Gestione Servizi.

Fininvest is the largest shareholder of MFE - MediaForEurope, which is currently the biggest private entertainment competitor in Italy, owning three channels in Italy (Canale 5, Italia 1, Rete 4), two in Spain, the film production company Medusa Film, a digital TV broadcasting network, and many other companies related to TV broadcasting. The deal to sell Mediaset Premium collapsed in 2016.

Fininvest's voting rights on Mediolanum S.p.A. was capped at 9.9999% by Italian Insurance Supervisory Authority despite owning about 36% share capital of the financial conglomerate; the company reverse merger with subsidiary Banca Mediolanum in 2015. Fininvest had a shareholders' pact with Ennio Doris (the pact only bind to 25.5% share each, excess amount of share was not bind), the largest shareholder of Banca Mediolanum, making the pact had an absolute majority in the bank for 51% share capital.

On 5 August 2016 Fininvest signed a preliminary agreement to sell 99.93% stake of A.C. Milan to a Chinese private equity fund Sino-Europe Sports. The deal was completed on 13 April 2017.

On 15 February 2017 Fininvest announced that they bought an additional 2.9% shares of Mondadori (increased to 53.299%). It was followed by and additional 1.27% shares of Mediaset on 12 May. (Fininvest had also purchased more shares in December 2016, in response to hostile takeover by Vivendi.)

Other investments
Fininvest owned 0.99% stake in Mediobanca, and was part of the shareholders' pact that owned about 31% stake in the bank in total.

Controversies
The Berlusconi family does not control the company directly. Instead, its shares are owned by 38 separate companies, all named 'Holding Italiana' followed by a number (1-38), most of which are in turn controlled by Berlusconi. These 'Holding Italiane' have repeatedly come under investigation by the police for various financial and accounting irregularities, slush funds and money-laundering. All of them were created at the end of the 1970s by covert associates of Berlusconi's and received significant investments (several hundreds of millions of euros at today's value) from still unknown sources.  Some of their liquidity was even deposited in cash. Much of the documentation of that time relative to the early financial and banking operations of these companies has been lost, in one case in a fire.

A report on those matters was commissioned by the general Dipartimento Investigativo Anti-Mafia (Bureau of Anti-Mafia Investigation) of Palermo in the 1990s from a finance expert working at the Bank of Italy, Francesco Giuffrida, to supplement the evidence in a tentative case against Berlusconi and associates for their alleged involvement with the Sicilian Mafia. In 1998 the case was temporarily shelved because of a lack of sufficient evidence to go to trial.

References

External links
  

 
Financial services companies of Italy
Holding companies of Italy
Berlusconi family
Companies based in Milan
Companies based in Rome
Financial services companies established in 1978
Holding companies established in 1978
Italian companies established in 1978